A tithe barn was a type of barn used in much of northern Europe in the Middle Ages for storing rents and tithes. Farmers were required to give one-tenth of their produce to the established church. Tithe barns were usually associated with the village church or rectory, and independent farmers took their tithes there. The village priests did not have to pay tithes—the purpose of the tithe being their support. Some operated their own farms anyway. The former church property has sometimes been converted to village greens.

Many were monastic barns, originally used by the monastery itself or by a monastic grange. The word 'grange' is (indirectly) derived from Latin  ('granary'). Identical barns were found on royal domains and country estates.

The medieval aisled barn was developed in the 12th and 13th centuries, following the examples of royal halls, hospitals and market halls. Its predecessors included Roman horrea and Neolithic long houses.

According to English Heritage, "exactly how barns in general were used in the Middle Ages is less well understood than might be expected, and the subject abounds with myths (for example, not one of England's surviving architecturally impressive barns was a tithe barn, although such barns existed)".

Examples

England

Medieval
There are surviving examples of medieval barns in England, some of them known as "tithe barns". English Heritage established criteria to determine if barns were used as tithe barns. The total number of surviving medieval barns (dated up to 1550) in Britain may be estimated about 200.

 Aberford C of E Primary School, Aberford, Leeds (Aberford School was based on a redundant tithe barn)
 Bank Hall Barn, Bretherton, Lancashire
 The Bishop's Barn, Wells, Somerset
 Bishop's Cleeve Tithe Barn, Gloucestershire
 Bradford on Avon Tithe Barn, Wiltshire
 Carlisle Tithe Barn
 Church of the Holy Ghost, Midsomer Norton, Somerset
 The Corbett Theatre, Loughton, which was the tithe barn at Ditchling
 Cressing Temple
 East Riddlesden Hall (National Trust)
 The Great Barn, Bourn
 The Great Barn, Ruislip, Middlesex
 The Great Barn, Titchfield
 The Great Barn, Wanborough, Surrey
 Great Coxwell Tithe Barn, Oxfordshire
 Harmondsworth Great Barn, Harmondsworth, Middlesex
 Landbeach Tithe Barn, Landbeach, Cambridgeshire
 Middle Littleton tithe barn
 Nether Poppleton Tithebarn, City of York
 Parish Hall and Rectory Chapel, Freshwater, Isle of Wight
 Sextry Barn, Ely
 Swalcliffe Barn, Oxfordshire
 Tithe Barn, Dunster
 Tithe Barn, Maidstone, Kent
 Tithe Barn, Manor Farm, Doulting, Somerset
 Tithe Barn, Pilton, Somerset
 Upminster Tithe Barn, Upminster, Essex
 Upper Heyford tithe barn, Oxfordshire
 Haddenham tithe barn, Buckinghamshire
 West Pennard Court Barn

Later
There are many extant barns that date from after the Medieval period and may be called "tithe barns" by their owners or councils. These include:
Loseley Park tithe barn (17th century)
Melling Tithebarn, Merseyside (c. 18th century)

Scotland
 Barn Church, Culloden

Germany
Castle of Lissingen, Rhineland-Palatinate

France
Grange dimière, Tremblay-en-France
Grange de Meslay
Priory of Le Mont Saint-Michel (Ardevon).
Silve Bénite in Le Pin (12th century).
Écouen (14th–17th century).
Ardenne Abbey in Saint-Germain-la-Blanche-Herbe (12th century).
Samoreau (13th century).
Maubuisson Abbey (13th century).
Tremblay-en-France (13th century).
Wissous (13th century).
Chenu (13th century).
Dammarie-en-Puisaye.
Maroilles Abbey (1735).
Wallers.

Belgium
13th-century tithe barn of Ter Doest Abbey 
Herkenrode Abbey near Hasselt

See also
Bishop's storehouse
Staddle stones: Function
Tithe map
Tithing buildings of The Church of Jesus Christ of Latter-day Saints, all or mostly in the United States

Notes and references

Further reading

External links

Photographs of tithe barns on geograph.org.uk

 
Barns
Lists of buildings and structures in England